José Claramunt Torres (born 10 July 1946) is a Spanish retired footballer who played as a midfielder.

He played solely for Valencia, competing in 12 La Liga seasons and appearing in 381 official games (83 goals scored).

Club career
Born in Puçol, Valencian Community, Claramunt spent his entire career with local club Valencia CF. He made his La Liga debut on 11 September 1966 in a 1–0 away win against Deportivo de La Coruña, and scored his first goal in the competition on 27 November in a 3–0 home victory over Sevilla FC.

Claramunt scored three goals in 30 games in the 1970–71 campaign to help the Che win the national championship, including one in a 2–0 win at FC Barcelona on 31 October 1970. Additionally, during his spell, the side appeared in four Copa del Rey finals – losing three in a row from 1970 to 1972 – and he opened the scoring in the 1971 edition against Barcelona, netting from a penalty kick but in a 3–4 extra-time defeat.

Claramunt retired in 1978, at the age of nearly 32. His hometown club UD Puçol's ground was named Estadio José Claramunt in his honour.

International career
Claramunt earned 23 caps for Spain over seven years, scoring four times. He made his debut on 28 February 1968 in a 3–1 friendly win against Sweden, and netted his first goal on 17 January 1973 in a 3–2 victory in Greece for the 1974 FIFA World Cup qualifiers.

For six games, Claramunt acted as national team captain due to the absence of Amancio.

International goals

|-
| 1. || 17 January 1973 || Leoforos, Athens, Greece ||  || 2–2 || 3–2 || 1974 World Cup qualification
|-
| 2. || 21 February 1973 || La Rosaleda, Málaga, Spain ||  || 1–0 || 3–1 || 1974 World Cup qualification
|-
| 3. || 24 November 1973 || Neckarstadion, Stuttgart, West Germany ||  || 1–2 || 1–2 || Friendly
|-
| 4. || 25 September 1974 || Idrætsparken, Copenhagen, Denmark ||  || 1–0 || 2–1 || Euro 1976 qualifying
|}

Personal life
Claramunt's younger brother, Enrique, was also a footballer. He too represented Valencia and they shared teams during four seasons, being thus known as Claramunt I and Claramunt II.

Honours
La Liga: 1970–71
Copa del Generalísimo: 1966–67; Runner-up 1969–70, 1970–71, 1971–72

See also
List of one-club men

References

External links

CiberChe biography and stats 

1946 births
Living people
People from Puçol
Sportspeople from the Province of Valencia
Spanish footballers
Footballers from the Valencian Community
Association football midfielders
La Liga players
Segunda División players
Atlético Saguntino players
Valencia CF Mestalla footballers
Valencia CF players
Spain international footballers